Bintan Resorts is the name for a resort enclave occupying the northern area of the Indonesian island of Bintan. It consists of nine resorts, plus a small service apartment development.

Although the area is within Indonesian territory, the island is marketed at residents from nearby Singapore, for whom Bintan is a short ferry trip away. The development received 410,454 visitors in 2009, of which the largest proportion, almost 30%, were Singaporean.

The area is generally a short-stay destination, with 90% of visitors staying less than seven days.

Bintan welcomed a record-breaking one million visitors for the first time in 2018.

References

External links
 
 

Tourism in Indonesia
Bintan Island
Buildings and structures in the Riau Islands